Brian Fowler (born 11 November 1971, in St Andrew, Jamaica) is a Jamaican racing driver competing in the FIA F4  US Championship.

Fowler made his professional debut in the 2011 IMSA Prototype Lites Championship with ANSA motosports. After a year hiatus returned for the 2013 Pirelli World Challenge in TCB with Shea Racing.

He also competed in the 2014 Canadian Formula 1600 super series, that had events supporting the Canadian Formula 1 Grand Prix at Circuit Gilles Villeneuve and Honda Indy Toronto.

References

External links 
 
 

1971 births
Living people
Sportspeople from Kingston, Jamaica
Jamaican racing drivers

United States F4 Championship drivers